Madaline "Maddie" Davidson (born 8 January 1999) is a New Zealand trampoline gymnast. She competed at the 2020 Olympic Games and finished tenth in the qualification, making her the second reserve for the final. She is the first female trampolinist to represent New Zealand at the Olympics.

Career 
Maddie Davidson was born on 8 January 1999 in Christchurch. Her parents enrolled her in trampoline classes after she began jumping on a family friend's backyard trampoline. She trains at Olympia Gymnastic Sports in Christchurch under coach Alex Nilov. In order to fund her training, she works as a trampoline coach and also as a personal assistant for an accountant.

Davidson began competing with Alexa Kennedy in synchro competitions in 2018 despite the two living and training on opposite ends of the country. At the 2018 World Cup in Maebashi, the pair finished sixth, and Davidson finished sixteenth as an individual. Then at the 2018 World Championships in Saint Petersburg, Kennedy and Davidson finished fourteenth in the qualification round. Individually, Davidson qualified into the semifinals where she finished thirteenth.

At the 2019 World Cup in Minsk, she won the bronze medal in the synchro event with Kennedy. Davidson only competed as an individual at the 2019 World Championships in Tokyo, and she only finished forty-second in the qualification round. She finished fourth at the 2021 World Cup in Brescia.

Davidson was selected to compete at the postponed 2020 Olympic Games, which made her the first female trampolinist to represent New Zealand at the Olympic Games. Gymnastics New Zealand chief executive Tony Compier remarked that her achievement was a "watershed moment ... one we hope will be inspirational to all young girls and women in our sport." At the Olympics, Davidson finished tenth in the qualification round with a total score of 93.140, which made her the second reserve for the final.

References

External links 
 
 

Living people
1999 births
New Zealand female trampolinists
Olympic gymnasts of New Zealand
Gymnasts at the 2020 Summer Olympics
21st-century New Zealand women